British American usually refers to  Americans whose ancestral origin originates wholly or partly in the United Kingdom (England, Scotland, Wales, Northern Ireland, Cornwall, Orkney, and the Isle of Man). It is primarily a demographic or historical research category for people who have at least partial descent from peoples of Great Britain and the modern United Kingdom, i.e. English, Scottish, Welsh, Scotch-Irish, Orcadian, Manx, and Cornish Americans.

Based on 2020 American Community Survey estimates, 1,934,397 individuals identified as having British ancestry, while a further 25,213,619 identified as having English ancestry, 5,298,861 Scottish ancestry and 1,851,256 Welsh ancestry. The total of these groups, at 34,298,133, was 10.5% of the total population. A further 31,518,129 individuals identified as having Irish ancestry, but this is not differentiated between modern Northern Ireland and the Republic of Ireland. Figures for Manx and Cornish ancestries are not separately reported, although Manx was reported prior to 1990, numbering 9,220 on the 1980 census. This figure also does not include people reporting ancestries in countries with majority or plurality British ancestries, such as New Zealander (21,575) or Australian (105,152). There has been a significant drop overall, especially from the 1980 census where 49.59 million people reported English ancestry.

Demographers regard current figures as a serious under-count, as a large proportion of Americans of British descent have a tendency to identify as 'American' since 1980 where over 13.3 million or 5.9% of the total U.S. population self-identified as "American" or "United States", this was counted under "not specified". This response is highly overrepresented in the Upland South, a region settled historically by the British. Those of mixed European ancestry may identify with a more recent and differentiated ethnic group. Of the top ten family names in the United States (2010), seven have English origins or having possible mixed British Isles heritage, the other three being of Spanish origin.

Not to be confused are cases when the term is also used in an entirely different (although possibly overlapping) sense to refer to people who are dual citizens of both the United Kingdom and the United States.

Sense of heritage

Americans of British heritage are often seen, and identify, as simply "American" due to the many historic, linguistic and cultural ties between Great Britain and the U.S. and their influence on the country's population. A leading specialist, Charlotte Erickson, found them to be ethnically "invisible". This may be due to the early establishment of British settlements; as well as to non-English groups having emigrated in order to establish significant communities.

Number of British Americans
Table below shows the results from 1980 when ancestry was first collected by the U.S. census and the 2020 American Community Survey. Response rates for the ancestry question was 90.4% in 1990 and 80.1% in 2000 for the total U.S. population.

Composition of Colonial America

According to estimates by Thomas L. Purvis (1984), published in the European ancestry of the United States, gives the ethnic composition of the American colonies from 1700 to 1755. British ancestry in 1755 was estimated to be 52% English and Welsh, 7.0% Scots-Irish, and 4% Scottish.

Studies on origins, 1790

The ancestry of the 3,929,214 population in 1790 has been estimated by various sources by sampling last names in the very first United States official census and assigning them a country of origin.
There is debate over the accuracy between the studies with individual scholars and the Federal Government using different techniques and conclusion for the ethnic composition.
A study published in 1909 titled A Century of Population Growth by the Census Bureau estimated the British origin combined were around 90% of the white population.

Another source by Thomas L. Purvis in 1984 estimated that people of British ancestry made up about 62% of the total population or 74% of the white or European American population.
Some 81% of the total United States population was of European heritage.
Around 757,208 were of African descent with 697,624 being slaves.

A Century of Population Growth (1909)

American Council of Learned Societies (1929)
The 1909 Century of Population Growth report came under intense scrutiny in the 1920s; its methodology was subject to criticism over fundamental flaws that cast doubt on the accuracy of its conclusions. The catalyst for controversy had been passage of the Immigration Act of 1924, which imposed numerical quotas on each country of Europe limiting the number of immigrants to be admitted out of a finite total annual pool. The size of each national quota was determined by the National Origins Formula, in part computed by estimating the origins of the colonial stock population descended from White Americans enumerated in the 1790 Census. The undercount of other colonial stocks like German Americans and Irish Americans would thus have contemporary policy consequences. When CPG was produced in 1909, the concept of independent Ireland did not even exist. CPG made no attempt to further classify its estimated 1.9% Irish population to distinguish Celtic Irish Catholics of Gaelic Ireland, who in 1922 formed the independent Irish Free State, from the Scotch-Irish descendants of Ulster Scots and Anglo-Irish of the Plantation of Ulster, which became Northern Ireland and remained part of the United Kingdom. In 1927, proposed immigration quotas based on CPG figures were rejected by the President's Committee chaired by the Secretaries of State, Commerce, and Labor, with the President reporting to Congress "the statistical and historical information available raises grave doubts as to the whole value of these computations as the basis for the purposes intended."
Among the criticisms of A Century of Population Growth:
 CPG failed to account for Anglicization of names, assuming any surname that could be English was actually English
 CPG failed to consider first names even when obviously foreign, assuming anyone with a surname that could be English was actually English
 CPG failed to consider regional variation in ethnic settlement e.g. surname Root could be assumed English in Vermont (less than 1% German), but more commonly a variant of German Roth in states with large German American populations like populous Pennsylvania (home to more Germans than the entire population of Vermont)
 CPG started by classifying all names as Scotch, Irish, Dutch, French, German, Hebrew, or other. All remaining names which could not be classed with one of the 6 other listed nationalities, nor identified by the Census clerk as too exotic to be English, were assumed to be English
 CPG classification was an unscientific process by Census clerks with no training in history, genealogy, or linguistics, nor were scholars in those fields consulted
 CPG estimates were produced by a linear process with no checks on potential errors nor opportunity for peer review or scholarly revision once an individual clerk had assigned a name to a nationality

Concluding that CPG "had not been accepted by scholars as better than a first approximation of the truth", the Census Bureau commissioned a study to produce new scientific estimates of the colonial American population, in collaboration with the American Council of Learned Societies, in time to be adopted as basis for legal immigration quotas in 1929, and later published in the journal of the American Historical Association, reproduced in the table below. Note: as in the original CPG report, the "English" category encompassed England and Wales, grouping together all names classified as either "Anglican" (from England) or "Cambrian" (from Wales).

1980
The 1980 census was the first that asked people's ancestry. The 1980 United States Census reported 61,327,867 individuals or 31.67% of the total U.S. population self-identitfied as having British descent.
In 1980 16,418 Americans reported ‘Northern Islander’. No Scots-Irish (descendants of Ulster-Scots) ancestry was recorded, however over ten million people identified as Scottish.
This figure fell to over 5 million each in the following census when the Scotch-Irish were first counted.

1990
Over 90.4% of the United States population reported at least one ancestry, 9.6% (23,921,371) individuals  as "not stated" with a total of 11.0% being "not specified". Additional responses were Cornish (3,991), Northern Irish 4,009 and Manx 6,317.

2000
Most of the population who stated their ancestry as "American" (20,625,093 or 7.3%) are said to be of old colonial British ancestry.

Geographical distribution

Following are the top 10 highest percentage of people of English, Scottish and Welsh ancestry, in U.S. communities with 500 or more total inhabitants (for the total list of the 101 communities, see references)

English
 Hildale, UT 66.9%
 Colorado City, AZ 52.7%
 Milbridge, ME 41.1%
 Panguitch, UT 40.0%
 Beaver, UT 39.8%
 Enterprise, UT 39.4%
 East Machias, ME 39.1%
 Marriott-Slaterville, UT 38.2%
 Wellsville, UT 37.9%
 Morgan, UT 37.2%

Scottish
Lonaconing, MD town 16.1%
Jordan, IL township 12.6%
Scioto, OH township 12.1%
Randolph, IN township 10.2%
Franconia, NH town 10.1%
Topsham, VT town 10.0%
Ryegate, VT town 9.9%
Plainfield, VT town 9.8%
Saratoga Springs, UT town 9.7%
Barnet, VT town 9.5%

Welsh
Malad City, ID city 21.1
Remsen, NY town 14.6
Oak Hill, OH village 13.6
Madison, OH township 12.7
Steuben, NY town 10.9
Franklin, OH township 10.5
Plymouth, PA borough 10.3
Jackson, OH city 10.0
Lake, PA township 9.9
Radnor, OH township 9.8

2020 state totals
As of 2020, the distribution of British Americans (combined English, Welsh, Scottish, Scotch-Irish, and British ancestry self-identification) across the 50 states and DC is as presented in the following table:

History

Overview
The British diaspora consists of the scattering of British people and their descendants who emigrated from the United Kingdom. The diaspora is concentrated in countries that had mass migration such as the United States and that are part of the English-speaking world. A 2006 publication from the Institute for Public Policy Research estimated 5.6 million British-born people lived outside of the United Kingdom.

After the Age of Discovery the British were one of the earliest and largest communities to emigrate out of Europe, and the British Empire's expansion during the first half of the 19th century saw an "extraordinary dispersion of the British people", with particular concentrations "in Australasia and North America".

The British Empire was "built on waves of migration overseas by British people", who left the United Kingdom and "reached across the globe and permanently affected population structures in three continents". As a result of the British colonization of the Americas, what became the United States was "easily the greatest single destination of emigrant British".

Historically in the 1790 United States Census estimate and presently in Australia, Canada and New Zealand "people of British origin came to constitute the majority of the population" contributing to these states becoming integral to the Anglosphere. There is also a significant population of people with British ancestry in South Africa.

Colonial period

An English presence in North America began with the Roanoke Colony and Colony of Virginia in the late-16th century, but the first successful English settlement was established in 1607, on the James River at Jamestown. By the 1610s, an estimated 1,300 English people had traveled to North America, the "first of many millions from the British Isles". In 1620 the Pilgrims established the English imperial venture of Plymouth Colony, beginning "a remarkable acceleration of permanent emigration from England" with over 60% of trans-Atlantic English migrants settling in the New England Colonies. During the 17th century, an estimated 350,000 English and Welsh migrants arrived in North America, which in the century after the Acts of Union 1707 was surpassed in rate and number by Scottish and Irish migrants.
 
The British policy of salutary neglect for its North American colonies intended to minimize trade restrictions as a way of ensuring they stayed loyal to British interests. This permitted the development of the American Dream, a cultural spirit distinct from that of its European founders. The Thirteen Colonies of British America began an armed rebellion against British rule in 1775 when they rejected the right of the Parliament of Great Britain to govern them without representation; they proclaimed their independence in 1776, and subsequently constituted the first thirteen states of the United States of America, which became a sovereign state in 1781 with the ratification of the Articles of Confederation. The 1783 Treaty of Paris represented Great Britain's formal acknowledgment of the United States' sovereignty at the end of the American Revolutionary War.

In the original Thirteen Colonies, most laws contained elements found in the English common law system.

The vast majority of the Founding Fathers of the United States were of mixed British extraction. Most of these were of English descent, with smaller numbers of those of Scottish, Irish or Scots-Irish, and Welsh ancestry. A minority were of high social status and can be classified as White Anglo-Saxon Protestant (WASP).  Many of the prewar WASP elite were Loyalists who left the new nation.

Immigration after 1776

Nevertheless, longstanding cultural and historical ties have, in more modern times, resulted in the Special Relationship, the exceptionally close political, diplomatic and military co-operation of United Kingdom – United States relations. Linda Colley, a professor of history at Princeton University and specialist in Britishness, suggested that because of their colonial influence on the United States, the British find Americans a "mysterious and paradoxical people, physically distant but culturally close, engagingly similar yet irritatingly different".

For over two centuries (1789-1989) of early U.S. history, all Presidents with the exception of two (Van Buren and Kennedy) were descended from the varied colonial British stock, from the Pilgrims and Puritans to the Scotch-Irish and English who settled the Appalachia.

Cultural contributions
Much of U.S. culture shows influences from nation states of British culture. Colonial ties to Great Britain spread the English language, legal system and other cultural attributes. Historian David Hackett Fischer has posited that four major streams of immigration from the British Isles in the colonial era contributed to the formation of a new American culture, summarized as follows:

 East Anglia to New England - The Exodus of the English Puritans (Pilgrims and Puritans influenced the Northeastern United States' corporate and educational culture)
 The South of England to the lowland South - The Cavaliers and Indentured Servants (Gentry influenced the Southern United States' plantation culture)
Northern England to the Delaware Valley - The Friends' Migration (Quakers influenced the Middle Atlantic and Midwestern United States' industrial culture)
 The Scottish Lowlands to the Backcountry - The Flight from North Britain (Scotch-Irish, of lowland Scottish and border English descent, influenced the Western United States' ranch culture and the Southern United States' common agrarian culture)

Fischer's theory acknowledges the presence of other groups of immigrants during the colonial period, both from the British Isles (the Welsh and the Highland Scots) and not (Germans, Dutch, and French Huguenots), but believes that these did not culturally contribute as substantially to the United States as his main four.

Historical influence
Apple pie – New England was the first region to experience large-scale English colonization in the early 17th century, beginning in 1620, and it was dominated by East Anglian Calvinists, better known as the Puritans. Baking was a particular favorite of the New Englanders and was the origin of dishes seen today as quintessentially "American", such as apple pie and the oven-roasted Thanksgiving turkey. "As American as apple pie" is a well-known phrase used to suggest that something is all-American.

Automakers
Buick – David Dunbar Buick was a Scottish-born American, a Detroit-based inventor, best known for founding the Buick Motor Company.

Motorcycle manufacturer

Harley-Davidson – The Davidson brothers were of Scottish descent (William. A., Walter and Arthur Davidson) and William S. Harley of English descent. Along with Indian Motorcycle Manufacturing Company was the largest and most recognizable American motorcycle manufacturer.

Sports

Baseball - The earliest recorded game of base-ball for which the original source survives, involved the family of George II of Great Britain, played indoors in London in November 1748. The Prince is reported as playing "Bass-Ball" again in September 1749 in Walton-on-Thames, Surrey, against Lord Middlesex. The English lawyer William Bray wrote in his diary that he had played a game of baseball on Easter Monday 1755 in Guildford, also in Surrey. English lawyer William Bray recorded a game of baseball on Easter Monday 1755 in Guildford, Surrey; Bray's diary was verified as authentic in September 2008. This early form of the game was apparently brought to North America by British immigrants. The first appearance of the term that exists in print was in "A Little Pretty Pocket-Book" in 1744, where it is called Base-Ball. Today, rounders, which has been played in England since Tudor times, holds a similarity to baseball. Although, literary references to early forms of "base-ball" in the United Kingdom pre-date use of the term "rounders".

In addition to baseball, American football is a sport that developed from soccer and rugby, which are both sports that originated in the British Isles.

Continental Colors, 1775–1777

The Grand Union Flag is considered to be the first national flag of the United States. The design consisted of 13 stripes, red and white, representing the original Thirteen Colonies, the canton on the upper left-hand corner bearing the British Union Flag, the red cross of St. George of England with the white cross of St. Andrew of Scotland. The flag was first flown on December 2, 1775, by John Paul Jones (then a Continental Navy lieutenant) on the ship Alfred in Philadelphia).

Place names

Alabama
Birmingham after Birmingham, England

Connecticut
Essex, Connecticut after Essex, England
Greenwich, Connecticut after Greenwich, England
Manchester, Connecticut after Manchester, England
New London, Connecticut after London, England
Norfolk, Connecticut after Norfolk, England

Delaware
Dover after Dover, England
Kent County, Delaware after Kent, England
Wilmington named by Proprietor Thomas Penn after his friend Spencer Compton, Earl of Wilmington, who was prime minister in the reign of George II of Great Britain.

Maryland
Aberdeen, Maryland after Aberdeen, Scotland
Chester, Maryland after Chester, England
Chestertown, Maryland after Chester, England
Essex, Maryland after Essex, England
Glencoe, Maryland after Glencoe, Scotland
Hereford, Maryland after Hereford, England
Kensington, Maryland after Kensington, England
Manchester, Maryland after Manchester, England
Olney, Maryland after Olney, England
Westminster, Maryland after Westminster, England
Salisbury, Maryland after Salisbury, England

Massachusetts
Attleboro, Massachusetts after Attleborough, England
Bedford, Massachusetts after Bedford, England
Boston after Boston, England
Cambridge after the City of Cambridge, England
Charlton, Massachusetts after Charlton, London, England
Chelsea, Massachusetts after Chelsea, England
Falmouth, Massachusetts after Falmouth, England
Gloucester after Gloucester, England
Hampshire County, Massachusetts after Hampshire, England
Mansfield, Massachusetts after Mansfield, England
Middlesex County, Massachusetts after Middlesex, England
Plymouth, Massachusetts after Plymouth, England
Somerset, Massachusetts after Somerset, England
Southampton after Southampton, England
Suffolk County, Massachusetts after Suffolk, England
Swansea, Massachusetts after Swansea, Wales
Taunton, Massachusetts after Taunton, England
Weymouth, Massachusetts after Weymouth, Dorset, England
Worcester, Massachusetts after Worcester, England

Michigan
Birmingham after Birmingham, England
Plymouth after Plymouth, England

New Hampshire
New Hampshire state (after Hampshire)
Derry, New Hampshire after Derry, Northern Ireland
Durham, New Hampshire after Durham, England
Exeter, New Hampshire after Exeter, England
Londonderry, New Hampshire after Londonderry, Northern Ireland
Manchester after Manchester, England
New London, New Hampshire after London, England
Plymouth, New Hampshire after Plymouth, England
Portsmouth, New Hampshire after Portsmouth, England

New York State
New York (state) and New York City after York, England

North Carolina
Durham, North Carolina and Durham County, North Carolina after Durham, England
Halifax, North Carolina and Halifax County, North Carolina after Halifax, England
Brunswick County, North Carolina after House of Brunswick
New Hanover County, North Carolina after House of Hanover
Northampton County, North Carolina after Northampton, England
Richmond County, North Carolina after Richmond, London

Pennsylvania
Bucks County after Buckinghamshire, England
Chester County and Chester after Chester, England
Carlisle, Pennsylvania after Carlisle, England
Darby derived from Derby (pronounced "Darby"), the county town of Derbyshire (pronounced "Darbyshire")
Lancaster County and Lancaster after the city of Lancaster in the county of Lancashire in England, the native home of John Wright, one of the early settlers.
Reading, Berks County after Reading, Berkshire, England
Warminster after a small town in the county of Wiltshire, at the western extremity of Salisbury Plain, England.
York, Pennsylvania after York, England

Virginia
Crewe, Virginia after Crewe, England
Dumfries, Virginia after Dumfries, Scotland
Edinburg, Virginia after Edinburgh, Scotland
Falmouth, Virginia after Falmouth, England
Isle of Wight County, Virginia after Isle of Wight, England
Kilmarnock, Virginia after Kilmarnock, Scotland
Glasgow, Virginia after Glasgow, Scotland
Gloucester, Virginia after Gloucester, England
Richmond, Virginia and Richmond County, Virginia after Richmond, London
Lancaster County, Virginia after Lancashire, England
Hampton, Virginia after Hampton, London, England
Midlothian, Virginia after Midlothian, Scotland
New Kent County, Virginia after Kent County, England
Norfolk, Virginia after Norfolk, England
Northampton County, Virginia after Northampton, England
Northumberland County, Virginia after Northumberland, England
Portsmouth, Virginia after Portsmouth, England
Stafford, Virginia after Stafford, England
Suffolk, Virginia after Suffolk, England
Westmoreland County, Virginia after Westmoreland (now part of Cumbria, England)
Winchester, Virginia after Winchester, England
 
In addition, some places were named after the kings and queens of the former kingdoms of England and Ireland. The name Virginia was first applied by Queen Elizabeth I (the "Virgin Queen") and Sir Walter Raleigh in 1584., the Carolinas were named after King Charles I and Maryland named so for his wife, Queen Henrietta Maria (Queen Mary). The Borough of Queens in New York was named after Catherine of Braganza (Queen Catherine), the wife of the King Charles II.

See also

Anglo-Celtic Australians
Hyphenated American
English diaspora
 English Americans
List of English Americans
 Scotch-Irish Americans
List of Scots-Irish Americans
 Scottish Americans
List of Scottish Americans
 Welsh Americans
List of Welsh Americans
 White Anglo-Saxon Protestants, called WASPs
Americans in the United Kingdom
Britons in Mexico

References

Scholarly sources
 
 Bridenbaugh, Carl. Vexed and Troubled Englishmen, 1590-1642 (1976).
 
 
 Erickson, Charlotte. Invisible Immigrants: The Adaptation of English and Scottish Immigrants in Nineteenth-Century America (1972_.
 
 Furer, Howard B., ed. The British in America: 1578-1970 (1972).
  the standard reference source for all ethnic groups.
  McGill, David W., and John K. Pearce. "American families with English ancestors from the colonial era: Anglo Americans." in Ethnicity and family therapy (1996): 451-466; reviews modern social psychology of family types.
 

 Shepperson, Wilbur S. British emigration to North America: projects and opinions in the early Victorian period (1957), examines opinion in Britain. online
 Tennenhouse, Leonard. The Importance of Feeling English: American Literature and the British Diaspora, 1750-1850 (2007).
 Van Vugt, William E. "British (English, Scottish, Scots Irish, and Welsh) and British Americans, 1870–1940’." in Elliott Barkan, ed., Immigrants in American History: Arrival, Adaptation, and Integration (2013): 4:237+.
 Van Vugt, William E. British Buckeyes: The English, Scots, and Welsh in Ohio, 1700-1900 (2006).

External links

1980 U.S. Census ancestry lists
References
2000 Census Bureau ancestry figures

 
 
American
European-American society